Carl Kevin Moeddel (December 28, 1937–August 25, 2009) was an American prelate of the Roman Catholic Church. He served as an auxiliary bishop of the Archdiocese of Cincinnati from 1993 to 2007.

Biography
Carl Moeddel was born in Cincinnati, Ohio, to Carl H. and Florence E. (née Pohlking) Moeddel. He studied at the Athenaeum of Ohio, from where he obtained a Bachelor of Arts degree; and was ordained to the priesthood by Archbishop Karl Alter on August 15, 1962. He later earned a Master's in Divinity from the Athenaeum.

In 1963, he became assistant pastor of St. Louis Church, as well as Assistant Chancellor and Assistant Treasurer of the Archdiocese of Cincinnati. In addition to these duties, he was named Executive Secretary of the Archdiocesan Commission on Ecumenical and Interfaith Relations (1970), Director of the Continuing Education of Priests (1971), Vicar of Ecumenical and Interfaith Relations (1973), and Vice Chancellor of the Archdiocese (1975). He was President of the Ohio Council of Churches in 1973.

From 1976 to 1985, Moeddel served as pastor of St. Peter in Chains Cathedral. During this period, he was also Dean of the Cathedral Deanery (1976–1983), Archdiocesan Director of Finance (1978–1983), Vicar for Finance and Chairman of the Archdiocesan Financial Council (1983–1986). He was named pastor of St. James of the Valley Church in 1985.

On June 15, 1993, Moeddel was appointed Auxiliary Bishop of Cincinnati and Titular Bishop of Bistue by Pope John Paul II. He received his episcopal consecration on the following August 24 from Archbishop Daniel Pilarczyk, with Archbishop Edward McCarthy and Bishop James Garland serving as co-consecrators. He selected as his episcopal motto: "Be Reconciled."

As an auxiliary bishop, he served as vicar general of the Archdiocese and director of the Pastoral Services Department and Priest Personnel Office. He resigned his post for health reasons on June 20, 2007, having been diagnosed with vascular dementia connected with previous strokes and diabetes.

He died after a long illness in Cincinnati, aged 71.

See also

References

1937 births
2009 deaths
Roman Catholic bishops of Cincinnati
The Athenaeum of Ohio alumni
20th-century American Roman Catholic titular bishops
21st-century American Roman Catholic titular bishops
Roman Catholic Archdiocese of Cincinnati
People from Cincinnati
People with vascular dementia
People with diabetes